Bengt Tomas Holmström (born 23 January 1973) is a Swedish former professional ice hockey left winger who played his entire National Hockey League (NHL) career with the Detroit Red Wings, with whom he won four Stanley Cup championships; in 1997, 1998, 2002 and 2008.

During his playing career, Holmström was widely considered one of the NHL's best at screening the opposition's goaltender, as well as for his physical presence in front of the opposition's net.

Playing career
Holmström was first noticed by Detroit Red Wings scout Håkan Andersson in 1993 during a Swedish national team selection camp, where Holmström missed the cut, then again the next year while playing with Boden, where his coach, Niklas Wikegård, told Andersson that Holmström was the team's best player. He was then drafted 257th overall by Detroit in the 1994 NHL Entry Draft and began playing for the Red Wings in the 1996–97 season. During the 2004–05 NHL lockout, Holmström returned to Sweden to play for his old team, Luleå HF, in the Swedish top flight league, the Elitserien.

Holmström was inducted into the Piteå Wall of Fame in his hometown in 2006.

On 7 April 2007 Holmström scored his 30th goal of the 2006–07 season against the Chicago Blackhawks, reaching the 30-goal plateau in a season for the first time in his career.

Holmström scored 12 points during the 2008 Stanley Cup playoffs as the Red Wings won the Stanley Cup for the fourth time in 11 years over the Pittsburgh Penguins. On his day with the Cup, he had his cousin's daughter baptized in it.

During the 2009–10 season, Holmström was initially selected to play in the 2010 Winter Olympics in Vancouver, British Columbia. A knee injury sustained on 13 February 2010, in a game against the Ottawa Senators, however, prevented him from playing in the tournament. It was announced the next day, 14 February, that he would be replaced by friend and Red Wing teammate Johan Franzén. The announcement came from Sweden Head Coach Bengt-Åke Gustafsson. On 4 June 2010, during the season's subsequent off-season, Holmström agreed on a two-year contract extension to remain in Detroit after an impressive season in which he scored 25 goals, second on the team only to sniper Pavel Datsyuk's 27; Holmström also scored a team-high 13 goals on the power play.

On 12 February 2012 Holmström became only the sixth Red Wing and 272nd NHL player to play 1,000 games.

After the retirement of long-time Red Wings defenceman Nicklas Lidström at the end of the 2011–12 season, Holmström became the last active player from the 1997 and 1998 Stanley Cup-winning Detroit teams to still be active with the team. However, he didn't play a single game after Lidström announced his retirement.

On 22 January 2013 Holmström announced his retirement from professional hockey just hours before Detroit's home opener at Joe Louis Arena against the Dallas Stars in the lockout-shortened season. , Holmström held the following records with the Red Wings: sixth in most regular season games played, fourth in playoff games played and 13th in points scored.

Playing style
During his playing career, Holmström was known for his presence in front of the opposition's goal and his ability to screen the opposing team's goaltender. Because he had to withstand teammates' shots towards goal, as well as efforts from opponents to vacate him from in front of the net, Holmström wore additional padding to protect his body.  During a playoff series against the Columbus Blue Jackets in 2009, Detroit Head Coach Mike Babcock said of Holmström, "I think there's [defencemen] out there who think they might actually get to him. That's just not possible."

Due to his obstructive playing style and close proximity to goalies and the crease, Holmström attained a reputation and was often charged with goaltender interference penalties as well as occasionally having goals called back because of his proximity to the goaltender's crease. Holmström himself, as well as Red Wings TV announcers Mickey Redmond and Ken Daniels, often questioned the legitimacy of these calls by the on-ice officials, obviously.

Holmström was known to many fans in Detroit by the nickname of "Homer." He acquired the nickname "Demolition Man" while playing in Sweden, where he was also called "Holma."

International play

Holmström has participated in four international tournaments for Sweden:
1996 Men's World Ice Hockey Championships
2002 Winter Olympics
2004 World Cup of Hockey
2006 Winter Olympics

Career statistics

Regular season and playoffs

International

Awards
 Elitserien gold medal with Luleå HF in 1996;
 Named to the Swedish All-Star Team in 1996;
 Gold medal at the Winter Olympics in 2006;
 Four-time Stanley Cup winner (1997, 1998, 2002, 2008).

See also
List of NHL players with 1,000 games played

References

External links

 

1973 births
Detroit Red Wings draft picks
Detroit Red Wings players
Ice hockey players at the 2002 Winter Olympics
Ice hockey players at the 2006 Winter Olympics
Living people
Luleå HF players
Medalists at the 2006 Winter Olympics
Olympic gold medalists for Sweden
Olympic ice hockey players of Sweden
Olympic medalists in ice hockey
People from Piteå
Stanley Cup champions
Swedish expatriate ice hockey players in the United States
Swedish ice hockey left wingers
Sportspeople from Norrbotten County